The 1976–77 NCAA Division I men's basketball season began in November 1976, progressed through the regular season and conference tournaments, and concluded with the 1977 NCAA Men's Division I Basketball Tournament Championship Game on March 27, 1977, at The Omni in Atlanta, Georgia. The Marquette Warriors won their first NCAA national championship with a 67–59 victory over the North Carolina Tar Heels.

Rule changes 
The slam dunk, prohibited in NCAA basketball games and warm-ups since the 1967–68 season because of criticism that it rewarded height rather than skill, once again became legal after a nine-season absence.

Season headlines 
 In the Pacific 8 Conference, UCLA won its 11th of what would ultimately be 13 consecutive conference titles.

Season outlook

Pre-season polls 

The top 20 from the AP Poll during the pre-season.

Conference membership changes 

The Eastern Collegiate Basketball League, with eight members, and the Sun Belt Conference, with six members, both began play this season. The ECBL, popularly known as the "Eastern 8," became the Eastern Athletic Association the following season and eventually became the Atlantic 10 Conference.

The Yankee Conference dropped all sports except football at the end of the previous season, and seven of its members left the conference before this season began.

Although Chattanooga joined the Southern Conference this season, it still was considered a Division II program. It completed its transition to Division I status after the conclusion of the season.

Regular season

Conference winners and tournaments 

From 1975 to 1982, the Eastern College Athletic Conference (ECAC), a loosely organized sports federation of Northeastern colleges and universities, organized Division I ECAC regional tournaments for those of its members that were independents in basketball. Each 1977 tournament winner received an automatic bid to the 1977 NCAA Men's Division I Basketball Tournament in the same way that the tournament champions of conventional athletic conferences did.

Informal championships

Statistical leaders

Post-season tournaments

NCAA tournament

Final Four 

 Third Place – UNLV 106, UNC Charlotte 94

National Invitation tournament

Semifinals & finals 

 Third Place – Villanova 102, Alabama 89

Awards

Consensus All-American teams

Major player of the year awards 

 Wooden Award: Marques Johnson, UCLA
 Naismith Award: Marques Johnson, UCLA
 Helms Player of the Year: Marques Johnson, UCLA
 Associated Press Player of the Year: Marques Johnson, UCLA
 UPI Player of the Year: Marques Johnson, UCLA
 NABC Player of the Year: Marques Johnson, UCLA
 Oscar Robertson Trophy (USBWA): Marques Johnson, UCLA
 Adolph Rupp Trophy: Marques Johnson, UCLA
 Sporting News Player of the Year: Marques Johnson, UCLA

Major coach of the year awards 

 Associated Press Coach of the Year: Bob Gaillard, San Francisco
 Henry Iba Award (USBWA): Eddie Sutton, Arkansas
 NABC Coach of the Year: Dean Smith, North Carolina
 UPI Coach of the Year: Bob Gaillard, San Francisco
 Sporting News Coach of the Year: Lee Rose, UNC Charlotte

Other major awards 

 Frances Pomeroy Naismith Award (Best player under 6'0): Jeff Jonas, Utah
 Robert V. Geasey Trophy (Top player in Philadelphia Big 5): Keven McDonald, Penn
 NIT/Haggerty Award (Top player in New York City metro area): Rich Laurel, Hofstra

Coaching changes 

A number of teams changed coaches during the season and after it ended.

References